Windham Hill Records was an independent record label that specialized in instrumental acoustic music. It was founded by guitarist William Ackerman and Anne Robinson (née McGilvray) in 1976 and was popular in the 1980s and 1990s.

The label was purchased by BMG through a series of buyouts from 1992 through 1996 and is currently a subsidiary of Sony Music Entertainment after BMG's subsequent merger in 2008. Private Music, also a subsidiary of BMG, has issued some back-catalog releases under the Windham Hill Records imprint. Since the Sony merger in 2007, Windham Hill has released no new material but reissues albums and compilations as part of Sony's Legacy Recordings brand.

Origin
In 1975, William Ackerman was a college dropout who played acoustic guitar on the Stanford University campus. Friends asked him to record his instrumental music for them on cassette. They chipped in so that he could make an album titled The Search for the Turtle's Navel (later renamed In Search of the Turtle's Navel). He gave copies to radio stations, which attracted an audience as well as California record store owners, and his albums began to sell. He founded the label with his girlfriend Anne Robinson in 1976. Ackerman invited like-minded musicians to the label, including Alex De Grassi, his cousin and an acoustic guitarist who became one of Windham Hill's best sellers. Ackerman began recording friends and fellow Bay Area musicians, and Robinson would market and design the albums.

Defining the brand
Windham Hill produced music that was difficult to define, with elements of classical, folk, and jazz, nearly all of it instrumental, acoustic, and mellow. California-based Tower Records stores gave Windham Hill its own section. Billboard magazine called the music soft jazz in 1983, but later listed the label as new age. The roster included acoustic guitarists Michael Hedges, David Cullen, John Doan, and Andrew York. The label's albums topped the New Age and Contemporary Jazz charts in Billboard magazine. Albums of solo piano by George Winston crossed over into the Pop and Folk charts. Seven albums by Winston have been certified Gold and Platinum by the Recording Industry Association of America (RIAA).

The staff concentrated on the quality of recording and pressing. Anne Robinson, a student of design, produced covers that were minimal, with a centered photograph of nature surrounded by a large area, usually white, with the artist and album name in Avant Garde Gothic. The albums were packaged in loose plastic rather than tight cellophane, and distributed in health-food stores and book stores.

Buyouts
Windham Hill's music was distributed by A&M Records until PolyGram purchased A&M in 1989. When A&M was purchased, Ackerman and Robinson began considering selling Windham Hill to a media conglomerate. When BMG took over distribution from A&M in 1989, they began negotiations to purchase Windham Hill from its two principal shareholders. Ackerman sold his half of the company to BMG in 1992 and Anne Robinson sold her half in 1996. BMG relocated the Windham Hill office to Los Angeles and began distributing Windham Hill through RCA Records. BMG merged other music labels that they purchased (such as Peter Baumann's Private Music) into Windham Hill, forming the Windham Hill Group. In doing so, artists such as Yanni and Vangelis joined the label, though they were not original Windham Hill artists.

Jim Brickman was the last artist signed to the label pre-buyout and he was the last artist to leave Windham Hill in 2006, joining Savoy Records. George Winston, who founded his own Dancing Cat Records in the early 1980s, continued working with Windham Hill as a distribution partner until the label was closed in 2007. BMG negotiated a distribution arrangement with Dancing Cat and Winston moved to RCA Victor until 2009, and Sony Classical thereafter. Winston is the only original Windham Hill artist still actively working as an artist under Windham Hill's parent company.

Legacy
Today a majority of Windham's releases are distributed through Legacy Recordings, a division of Sony Music Entertainment. For Windham Hill's 30th Anniversary in 2006, Sony BMG released a special collection kit, with an article from Will Ackerman.

For the first time in over 15 years, many of the early Windham Hill artists who recorded under Ackerman performed together on August 27, 2006 at the Villa Montalvo in Saratoga, California near San Jose. Artists included: Barbara Higbie, Jim Brickman, Tuck & Patti, Andrew Robert Nelson, Alex de Grassi, Liz Story, Philip Aaberg, Michael Manring, Samite, David Cullen, Tracy Silverman, Lisa Lynne, George Tortorelli, Sean Harkness (who also planned and invited the musicians), and Will Ackerman.

In 2008 Sony absorbed all of the BMG assets including Windham Hill. The next year, Valley Entertainment began reissuing titles from the Windham Hill catalog. Other acoustic music record labels have also signed licensing deals with Legacy Recordings, including Adventure Music, Gnome Life Records, Grass-Tops Recording and Dancing Cat.

The label was mentioned on the cult TV series Mystery Science Theater 3000, as well as its spiritual successor RiffTrax.

Associated labels
 Dancing Cat Records: A label founded by George Winston that began with Winston's albums and migrated to Hawaiian music, received distribution through Windham Hill. Dancing Cat remains an independent label under Sony Classical.
 High Street Records: A singer-songwriter-oriented sub-label started by Will Ackerman and managed by Dawn Atkinson and Bob Duskis.
 Hip Pocket: A jazz-oriented label started by Andy Narell and Steven Miller in 1981, folded into the Windham Hill Jazz label with Magenta in 1987.
 Magenta: A jazz-oriented label, started by Steve Backer in 1985, folded into the Windham Hill Jazz label with Hip Pocket in 1987.
 Living Music: A new age label started by Paul Winter in 1980, distributed by Windham Hill from 1986 to 1988.
 Lost Lake Arts: An imprint that reissued out-of-print albums. A total of 13 albums were released on the label between 1981 and 1988.
 Open Air: A vocal label that released seven albums between 1985 and 1989.
 Rabbit Ears: A children's entertainment company whose music was developed with and distributed by Windham Hill from 1984 to 1990.
 Pioneer Artists: A music video label that reissued Windham Hill titles on DVD and VHS beginning in January 2000.

Roster

See also
Music West Records
Private Music

References

External links 
 Windham Hill Records Discography Includes reviews, samples, track listings, and liner notes. 
 Windham Hill Records Windham Hill history, artists, discographies, awards, formats and prices, music charts, employees and bibliography. 
 A Winter's Solstice Discography Includes reviews and samples of the Windham Hill Winter's Solstice and holiday music catalog.
 Legacy Recordings Reissues much of Windham Hill's catalog

American record labels
New-age music record labels
Record labels established in 1976
Sony Music
Vanity record labels
Folk record labels
World music record labels
Jazz record labels
 
 
1976 establishments in the United States